Csikos may refer to:

 Emily Csikos, Canadian water polo player
 John Csikos, Canada men's national water polo team coach
 Gábor Csíkos, actor in The Hunchback
 Mihály Csikós, a Hungarian sportsman participating in 1938 Wimbledon Championships - Men's Singles
 Csikos Post, a galop by Hermann Necke
 Béla Csikos-Sessia, the Hungarian version name for Croatian painter Bela Čikoš Sesija
 Csikós court, at Buda Castle
 A Csikós, a Hungarian film by Sándor Góth
 Csikós, the horseman of the Hungarian puszta